China's electric power industry is the world's largest electricity producer, passing the United States in 2011 after rapid growth since the early 1990s. In 2019, China produced more electricity than the next three countries—U.S., India, and Russia—combined.

Most of the electricity in China comes from coal, which accounted for 65% of the electricity generation mix in 2019. This is a big part of greenhouse gas emissions by China. However, electricity generation by renewables has been increasing steadily, from 615,005 GWh (17.66% of total) in 2008 to 2,082,800 GWh (27.32% of total) in 2020.

By the end of 2019, China's installed capacity for renewable energy was about 795 GW, while coal power capacity was 1040 GW. In 2020, China added 48GW of solar power and 71GW of wind power, and 13GW of hydropower, thus bringing the total installed renewable capacity to more than 900 GW. Out of the 900GW, solar power contributed 252GW while wind power contributed 281 GW, which was generated by more than 135,000 turbines. Coal-fired electricity production declined from 2013 to 2016 coinciding with a major boom in renewable energy, and a decline in GDP growth.

China has two wide area synchronous grids, the State Grid and the China Southern Power Grid. The northern power grids were synchronized in 2005.
Since 2011 all Chinese provinces are interconnected. The two grids are joined by HVDC back-to-back connections.

China has abundant energy with the world's fourth-largest coal reserves and massive hydroelectric resources. 
There is however a geographical mismatch between the location of the coal fields in the north-east (Heilongjiang, Jilin, and Liaoning) and north (Shanxi, Shaanxi, and Henan), hydropower in the south-west (Sichuan, Yunnan, and Tibet), and the fast-growing industrial load centers of the east (Shanghai-Zhejiang) and south (Guangdong, Fujian).

History

In April 1996, an Electric Power Law was implemented, a major event in China's electric power industry. The law set out to promote the development of the electric power industry, to protect the legal rights of investors, managers, and consumers, and to regulate the generation, distribution, and consumption.

Before 1994 electricity supply was managed by electric power bureaus of the provincial governments. Now utilities are managed by corporations outside of the government administration structure.

To end the State Power Corporation's (SPC) monopoly of the power industry, China's State Council dismantled the corporation in December 2002 and set up 11 smaller companies. SPC had owned 46% of the country's electrical generation assets and 90% of the electrical supply assets. The smaller companies include two electric power grid operators, five electric power generation companies, and four relevant business companies. Each of the five electric power generation companies owns less than 20% (32 GW of electricity generation capacity) of China's market share for electric power generation. Ongoing reforms aim to separate power plants from power-supply networks, privatize a significant amount of state-owned property, encourage competition, and revamp pricing mechanisms.

It is expected that the municipal electric power companies will be divided into electric power generating and electric power supply companies. A policy of competition between the different generators will be implemented in the next years.

South China from the Changjiang valley down to the South China Sea was the first part of the economy to liberalize in the 1980s and 1990s and is home to much of the country's most modern and often foreign-invested manufacturing industries. Northern and northeastern China's older industrial base has fallen behind, remains focused on the domestic economy, and has suffered a relative decline.

In recent history, China's power industry is characterized by fast growth and an enormous installed base. In 2014, it had the largest installed electricity generation capacity in the world with 1505 GW and generated 5583 TWh China also has the largest thermal power capacity, the largest hydropower capacity, the largest wind power capacity and the largest solar capacity in the world. Despite an expected rapid increase in installed capacity scheduled in 2014 for both wind and solar, and an expected increase to 60 GW in nuclear by 2020, coal will still account for between 65% and 75% of capacity in 2020.

In Spring 2011, according to The New York Times, shortages of electricity existed, and power outages should be anticipated.  The government-regulated price of electricity had not matched rising prices for coal.

In 2020, Chinese Communist Party general secretary Xi Jinping announced that China aims to go carbon-neutral by 2060 in accordance with the Paris climate accord.

Production and capacity

ChinaEnergyPortal.org

China Energy Portal publishes Chinese energy policy, news, and statistics and provides tools for their translation into English. Translations on this site depend entirely on contributions from its readers. 2020 electricity & other energy statistics (preliminary)

(Note that change in generation capacity is new installations minus retirements.)

National Bureau of Statistics of China
The official Statistics available in English are not all up to date. Numbers are given in "(100 million kw.h)" which equals 100 GWh or 0.1 TWh.

Sources

Coal power

China is the largest producer and consumer of coal in the world and is the largest user of coal-derived electricity. However, coal has been falling as a percentage of the energy mix, from over 80% in 2007 to 64% in 2018. Coal electricity generation has also declined in absolute terms since 2014. Despite China (like other G20 countries) pledging in 2009 to end inefficient fossil fuel subsidies,  there are direct subsidies and the main way coal power is favoured is by the rules guaranteeing its purchase – so dispatch order is not merit order.

To curtail the continued rapid construction of coal fired power plants, strong action was taken in April 2016 by the National Energy Administration (NEA), which issued a directive curbing construction in many parts of the country. This was followed up in January 2017 when the NEA canceled a further 103 coal power plants, eliminating 120 GW of future coal-fired capacity, despite the resistance of local authorities mindful of the need to create jobs. The decreasing rate of construction is due to the realization that too many power plants had been built and some existing plants were being used far below capacity. In 2020 over 40% of plants were estimated to be running at a net loss and new plants may become stranded assets. In 2021 some plants were reported close to bankruptcy due to being forbidden to raise electricity prices in line with high coal prices.

In 2019, reports show  that approvals  for new coal mines had  increased fivefold over approvals in 2018, and the China State Grid Corporation forecast that total coal power plant capacity would peak at 1,230–1,350 GW, an increase of about 200–300 GW. 
The think tank Carbon Tracker estimated the average loss was about US$4/MWh and that about 60% of power stations were cashflow negative in 2018 and 2019.
In 2020 Carbon Tracker estimated that 43% of coal-fired plants were already more expensive than new renewables and that 94% would be by 2025. According to a 2020 analysis by Energy Foundation China, in order to keep warming to 1.5 degrees C coal plants without carbon capture must be phased out by 2045. A 2021 study estimated that all coal power plants could be shut down by 2040, by retiring them at the end of their financial lifetime.

Hydropower

Hydroelectricity is currently China's largest renewable energy source and the second overall after coal.
China's installed hydro capacity in 2015 was 319 GW, up from 172 GW in 2009, including 23 GW of pumped storage hydroelectricity capacity.
In 2015, hydropower generated 1,126 TWh of power, accounting for roughly 20% of China's total electricity generation.

Due to China's insufficient reserves of fossil fuels and the government's preference for energy independence, hydropower plays a big part in the energy policy of the country.
China's potential hydropower capacity is estimated at up to 600 GW, but currently, the technically exploitable and economically feasible capacity is around 500 GW. There is therefore the considerable potential for further hydro development.
The country has set a 350 GW capacity target for 2020. Being flexible, existing hydropower can back up large amounts of solar and wind.

Hydroelectric plants in China have relatively low productivity, with an average capacity factor of 31%, a possible consequence of rushed construction and the seasonal variability of rainfall. Moreover, a significant amount of energy is lost due to the need for long transmission lines to connect the remote plants to where demand is most concentrated.

Although hydroelectricity represents the largest renewable and low greenhouse gas emissions energy source in the country, the social and environmental impact of dam construction in China has been large, with millions of people forced to relocate and large scale damage to the environment.

Wind power

With its large land mass and long coastline, China has exceptional wind resources: it is estimated China has about 2,380 GW of exploitable capacity on land and 200 GW on the sea. At the end of 2014, there was 114 GW of electricity generating capacity installed in China, more than the total nameplate capacity of China's nuclear power stations, (although capacity of wind power is not on par with capacity of nuclear power) and over the year 115,000 gigawatt-hours (GWh) of wind electricity had been provided to the grid. In 2011, China's plan was to have 100 GW of wind power capacity by the end of 2015, with an annual wind generation of 190 terawatt-hours (TWh).

China has identified wind power as a key growth component of the country's economy.

Nuclear power

In terms of nuclear power generation, China will advance from a moderate development strategy to an accelerating development strategy. Nuclear power will play an even more important role in China's future power development. Especially in the developed coastal areas with heavy power loads, nuclear power will become the backbone of the power structure there. China has planned to build up another 30 sets of nuclear power generators within 15 years with a total installed capacity of 80 GW by 2020, accounting for about 4% of China's total installed capacity of the electric power industry. This percentage is expected to double every 10 years for several decades out. Plans are for 200 GW installed by 2030 which will include a large shift to Fast Breeder reactor and 1500 GW by the end of this century.

Solar power

China is the world's largest market for both photovoltaics and solar thermal energy. 
Of the 7,623 TWh electricity produced in China in 2020, 261.1 TWh was generated by solar power, equivalent to 3.43% of total electricity production. 
This was a 289% increase since 2016, when production was 67.4 TWh, equivalent to an annual growth rate of 40.4%.

China has been the world's leading installer of solar photovoltaics since 2013 (see also growth of photovoltaics), and the world's largest producer of photovoltaic power since 2015. 
In 2017 China was the first country to pass 100 GW of cumulative installed PV capacity. However electricity prices are not properly varied by time of day, so do not properly incentivize system balancing.

Solar water heating is also extensively implemented, with a total installed capacity of 290 GWth at the end of 2014, representing about 70% of world's total installed solar thermal capacity. The goal for 2050 is to reach 1,300GW of Solar Capacity. If this goal is to be reached it would be the biggest contributor to Chinese electricity demand.

Natural gas

Biomass and waste

Storage and demand response

Energy storage and demand response are important for replacing coal generation.

Transmission infrastructure

The central government has made the creation of a unified national grid system a top economic priority to improve the efficiency of the whole power system and reduce the risk of localised energy shortages. It will also enable the country to tap the enormous hydro potential from western China to meet booming demand from the eastern coastal provinces. China is planning for smart grid and related Advanced Metering Infrastructure.

Ultra-high-voltage transmission

The main problem in China is the voltage drop when power is sent over very long distances from one region of the country to another.

Long distance inter-regional transmission has been implemented by using ultra-high voltages (UHV) of 800 kV, based on an extension of technology already in use in other parts of the world.

Companies
In terms of the investment amount of China's listed power companies, the top three regions are Guangdong province, Inner Mongolia Autonomous Region and Shanghai, whose investment ratios are 15.33%, 13.84% and 10.53% respectively, followed by Sichuan and Beijing.

China's listed power companies invest mostly in thermal power, hydropower and thermoelectricity, with their investments reaching CNY216.38 billion, CNY97.73 billion, and CNY48.58 billion respectively in 2007. Investment in gas exploration and coal mining follow as the next prevalent investment occurrences.

Major players in China's electric power industry include:

The five majors, and their listed subsidiaries:
The five majors are all SOEs directly administered by SASAC. Their listed subsidiaries are substantially independent, hence counted as IPPs, and are major power providers in their own right. Typically each of the big 5 has about 10% of national installed capacity, and their listed subsidiary has an extra 4 or 5% on top of that.

 China Datang Corporation
parent of Datang International Power Generation Company (SEHK: 991; SSE: 601991)
 China Guodian Corporation ("Guodian")
parent of GD Power Development Company (SSE: 600795),
 China Huadian Group
parent of Huadian Power International Co., Ltd.
 China Huaneng Group
parent of Huaneng Power International (NYSE:HNP)
 State Power Investment Corporation ("SPIC")
parent of China Power International Development Limited ("CPID", 2380.HK)

Additionally, two other SOEs also have listed IPP subsidiaries:
 the coalmine owning Shenhua Group
parent of China Shenhua Energy Company (SEHK: 1088, SSE: 601088)
 China Resources Group ("Huarun")
parent of China Resources Power Holdings Company Limited ("CRP", SEHK: 836)

Secondary companies:
 Shenzhen Energy Co., Ltd.
 Guangdong Yuedian Group Co., Ltd.
 Anhui Province Energy Group Co., Ltd.
 Hebei Jiantou Energy Investment Co., Ltd.
 Guangdong Baolihua New Energy Stock Co., Ltd.
 Shandong Luneng Taishan Cable Co., Ltd.
 Guangzhou Development Industry (Holdings) Co., Ltd.
 Chongqing Jiulong Electric Power Co., Ltd.
 Chongqing Fuling Electric Power Industrial Co., Ltd.
 Shenergy Company (SSE: 600642), Shanghai.
 Shenergy Group, Shanghai.
 Sichuan Chuantou Energy Stock Co., Ltd.
 Naitou Securities Co., Ltd.
 Panjiang Coal and Electric Power Group
 Hunan Huayin Electric Power Co., Ltd.
 Shanxi Top Energy Co., Ltd.
 Inner Mongolia Mengdian Huaneng Thermal Power Co., Ltd.
 SDIC Huajing Power Holdings Co., Ltd.
 Sichuan MinJiang Hydropower Co., Ltd.
 Yunnan Wenshan Electric Power Co., Ltd.
 Guangxi Guidong Electric Power Co., Ltd.
 Sichuan Xichang Electric Power Co., Ltd.
 Sichuan Mingxing Electric Power Co., Ltd.
 Sichuan Guangan Aaa Public Co., Ltd.
 Sichuan Leshan Electric Power Co., Ltd.
 Fujian MingDong Electric Power Co., Ltd.
 Guizhou Qianyuan Power Co., Ltd.

Nuclear and hydro:
 China Three Gorges Corporation
 China Guangdong Nuclear Power Group
 China Yangtze Power (listed)
 Sinohydro Corporation an engineering company.
 Guangdong Meiyan Hydropower Co., Ltd.

Grid operators include:
 State Grid Corporation of China
 China Southern Power Grid
 Wenzhou CHINT Group Corporation ("Zhengtai")
Creation of a spot market has been suggested to properly use energy storage.

Consumption and Territorial differences
More than a third of electricity is used by industry. China consists of three largely self-governing territories: the mainland, Hong Kong, and Macau. The introduction of electricity to the country was not coordinated between the territories, leading to partially different electrical standards. Mainland China uses type A and I power plugs with 220 V and 50 Hz; Hong Kong and Macau both use type G power plugs with 220 V and 50 Hz. Inter-territorial travelers may therefore require a power adapter.

References

Further reading

External links
 China Electric Power Research Institute – associated with the State Grid Corporation of China
 Office of the National Energy Leading Group
 China Electrotechnical Society
 Energy Research Institute of China
 China Electric Power Database
 China's oversupply of electric power worrisome 2 January 2006 Zhang Mingquan – HK Trade Council
 China Electric Power Industry Forum
 China EPower Forum

Industry in China